The following are characters who first appeared, or returned, in the BBC soap opera EastEnders during 2011 listed by order of first appearance. New characters were introduced by Bryan Kirkwood, executive producer.

The first main character to be announced was Eddie Moon, played by singer David Essex, who would be the father of Michael Moon (Steve John Shepherd). Poppy Meadow (Rachel Bright) was introduced in January 2011 as the best friend of Jodie Gold (Kylie Babbington), and Rob Grayson (Jody Latham) joined the series in February, as did Shenice Quinn (Lily Harvey). Ashley Chubb (Colin Mace) was introduced in March as the father of established character Fatboy (Ricky Norwood). In April, Janine Butcher's (Charlie Brooks) maternal grandmother, Lydia Simmonds (Margaret Tyzack/Heather Chasen), and Tanya Branning (Jo Joyner) and Rainie Cross' (Tanya Franks) mother, Cora Cross (Ann Mitchell), both joined the series and Martin (Alasdair Harvey) was introduced as the new love interest for Jane Beale (Laurie Brett). Eddie's sons Tyler (Tony Discipline) and Anthony Moon (Matt Lapinskas) were announced in May along with Dot Branning's (June Brown) half-sister, Rose Cotton (Polly Perkins) and her son Andrew (Ricky Grover). Lola Pearce (Danielle Harold), the granddaughter of Billy Mitchell (Perry Fenwick) and Julie Perkins (Cathy Murphy), was announced in June along with Norman Simmonds (George Layton), Lydia's son. A fourth Moon brother was introduced in September, Craig (Elliot Rosen), as well as Faith Olubunmi (Modupe Adeyeye), the younger sister of Mercy Olubunmi (Bunmi Mojekwu). In October, Syed (Marc Elliott) and Amira Masood's (Preeya Kalidas) daughter Yasmin arrives and Mark Garland (Chris Simmons) was introduced as a new love interest for Kat Moon (Jessie Wallace).

Poppy Meadow

Poppy Meadow, played by Rachel Bright, was introduced by executive producer Bryan Kirkwood on 11 January 2011 as the best friend of established character Jodie Gold (Kylie Babbington) in scenes filling in for those cut from a controversial baby-swap storyline. Poppy returned to the series in June 2011 as a supporting character and comedy element, in a move that was generally welcomed by the tabloid press; her storylines focused on her friendship with Jodie and their intertwined love lives. Both Jodie and Poppy left the series on 14 November 2011, but the possibility was left open for Poppy to return in the future. In June 2012 Bright reprised her role as Poppy, quickly moving into Walford and resuming her employment at the local beauty salon. Bright filmed her final scenes before Christmas 2013 and Poppy departed in the last week of January 2014.

Rob Grayson

Rob Grayson, played by Jody Latham, is a pimp who exploits Whitney Dean (Shona McGarty) for financial gain. His first appearance was on 22 February 2011, and he appeared until a special Comic Relief episode on 18 March 2011. He made a short return from 19 August 2011 until 26 August 2011.

He first appears when he witnesses Whitney attempting to pickpocket a man but ending up with cuts on her face. Rob rescues her from the situation, and buys her a meal. He gives her his number so she can contact him any time she needs to get away from Walford, before taking her home. They stay in contact and Rob is seen showing a friend a photo of Whitney. When Whitney either rejects or is rejected by all her friends and family, she contacts Rob and he takes her to stay with him. After Whitney has been missing for several days, Lauren Branning (Jacqueline Jossa) tries to phone her, leaving several messages. When she finally gets a voicemail back, it is from Rob saying if she calls again, there will be trouble.

Lauren tracks Whitney down to Dartford, but Whitney insists she is fine with Rob, and that they are in love. Rob meets Lauren at their bedsit and invites her out with them, but Lauren leaves. Rob then leaves Whitney alone with Chris (Richard Simons) and it is revealed that Rob is using Whitney to pay off his debts. Rob meets Lauren in a café and again invites her out and calls her beautiful. He then threatens her, saying he does not want to see her again. When Rob returns to the bedsit, Whitney is there with Janine Malloy (Charlie Brooks), who says she is taking Whitney home. Whitney refuses to go and Rob ejects Janine from the building. Rob then tells Whitney they are going out immediately, and drags her to the car as she refuses to go. Lauren and Janine watch as Rob drives away with Whitney. Rob takes Whitney to a house where she meets Chloe (Georgia Henshaw), another girl being exploited. Whitney realises she is there to have sex with men, so asks Rob if she can leave. Rob says to either be nice to his friends or he will hurt her. He grabs her and locks her in a room. She is unable to open the windows so when she hears people outside the door, she smashes a window, jumps to the ground and runs away with Rob calling after her. She then stops a car and asks for help. She later returns to Walford after being arrested for shoplifting. Whitney's half-brother Ryan Malloy (Neil McDermott) learns of what happened and wants to find Rob but Whitney says he has moved.

When Whitney starts a relationship with a man named Lee (Mitchell Hunt), it is revealed that he is a friend of Rob's, and when Whitney agrees to meet Lee by text, Rob takes control of Lee's mobile phone. Whitney goes to meet Lee and is shocked to see Rob instead. She is taken in by his charm until she texts Lee not to come, and then sees the message on Rob's phone. She allows Rob to take her home but then tells him to wait outside while she escapes through the back door and hitches a lift to Southend-on-Sea with friends. She leaves Rob a voicemail message not knowing that he has followed her. He finds her in her hotel room and tells her how much he loves her, but when Fatboy (Ricky Norwood) comes in, Rob attacks him, so Whitney tells him to leave. Fatboy calls Ryan, who comes to Southend to look for Rob. When he finds him, they fight and fall over the edge of the pier. A body is recovered from the sea, and is later revealed to be Rob's.

Development
In January 2011, it was announced that Whitney would be part of the sexual exploitation storyline. She is left alone and vulnerable, and falls for Rob, who then exploits her. EastEnders worked alongside charity Comic Relief on the storyline, which started planning in 2010. The storyline culminated during Red Nose Day 2011 on 18 March 2011, in a special 10-minute episode. Gilly Green, Head of UK Grants at Comic Relief, said: "It is vital that we continue to alert young people to the dangers if we are to stop them being exploited and the opportunity to work with EastEnders will make a huge audience aware of this issue. We have been working with the EastEnders script writers and some of the young women from projects we support to ensure the story reflects the reality of young people caught up in sexual exploitation." Kevin Cahill, Chief Executive of Comic Relief, added "We have worked over many years with EastEnders in all kinds of ways. It's been a real pleasure this year to work together on a piece of serious drama, in the best traditions of public service, which will highlight an important issue and also, because it occurs on the night of Comic Relief, actually help raise crucial funds to help young women caught up in it." An EastEnders insider spoke of the storyline leading up to Rob's arrival: "Janine's a terrible influence and is soon dragging Whitney into all sorts of shady schemes. Given that Janine used to be a prostitute, it makes sense that she's part of Whitney's journey. Whitney has no idea what she's letting herself in for. Janine is only part of the problem though. It's when she meets Rob—a deeply unscrupulous man—that her life starts to fall apart in a terrifying way." Rob has been called "evil" by The People and by executive producer Bryan Kirkwood, a "nasty piece of work" by Orange, and "sinister" by Daniel Kilkelly from Digital Spy.

McGarty hoped the storyline would raise awareness of the issue for young people, and explained that the storyline would be a continuing one, as "Whitney will live in fear that Rob and his gang are going to come after her when she escapes. That's what these people do. They don't just leave you to get on with your life. In their mind they own you." She also added that she hopes that the storyline will lead to better conviction rates as she said that they aren't 'good enough'. Latham revealed after his stint that he hoped to return, saying, "I always say it's better to play the bad guy—everyone remembers the bad guy. They get the best endings. I had an absolutely great time on EastEnders. It was a breath of fresh air. [...] Judging from the way it was left, the door is wide open, so you never know. I would love to come back and cause some trouble."

On 1 May 2011 it was reported by the Daily Star that Latham would return to EastEnders in a couple of weeks time to film the conclusion to the storyline. A source said, "Whitney will not be going back on the streets but the writers felt the storyline needed to be tied up so Jody is coming back for a couple of episodes. Whitney is currently having to come to terms with everything that she did while under Rob's spell and she's not coping very well. She's trying to move on but, with everyone knowing that she worked as a prostitute, she's finding it all very difficult. The writers decided it would be good for her to come face to face with Rob again once she's strong enough to do so. They've written the conclusion to her storyline and Jody will be back to film the dramatic ending in a couple of weeks time. Rob is set to finally get his ." An EastEnders spokesperson confirmed this. Kirkwood said that Rob would return when Whitney is at her most vulnerable, following the reveal of her brother Ryan's affair with her best friend Lauren. Scenes were filmed in Southend-on-Sea, Essex, for Rob's return, after Ryan tracks Rob down and finds Whitney with him. Ryan and Rob had a massive showdown on the pier, and Ryan murdered Rob as revenge for forcing Whitney into prostitution. Ryan then went on the run from the police, not wanting to get caught for murdering Rob.

Latham had received criticism from viewers who struggled to understand his Burnley accent. He said, "I'm sorry people are having difficulty with my accent. I'm sure the great fans of EastEnders will get used to it!" The storyline reportedly received criticism from fans. The BBC issued a statement, saying:

Speaking about how members of the public reacted to the storyline, Latham told OK!, "Considering Rob makes Phil Mitchell look like a field mouse, I've got to be quite grateful. I've not had a tin of baked beans chucked at me in Asda by some nice old lady. It's just a bit of banter off the public, which I relish. I've not had anyone threaten to beat me up yet, which is a plus point!"

Shenice Quinn

Shenice Quinn, played by nine-year-old (at the time of casting) Lily Harvey, is the daughter of Martina Quinn (Tamara Wall), who is an old friend of Kat Moon's (Jessie Wallace) from Spain. Martina reported Kat and her husband Alfie Moon (Shane Richie) to the police in Spain, leading to some animosity between Kat and Martina. Martina and Shenice arrive at The Queen Victoria public house, and Kat immediately throws water over Martina. However, she reveals that her bar was smashed up by the police and she was worried that she would lose Shenice if she did not tell the truth. Alfie bonds with Shenice, and Martina tells Kat that she has lost her bar and has nothing left, so Kat allows them to stay with her and Alfie at The Queen Vic. After a night out with Kat, Martina spends the day in bed. Kat later finds Shenice wearing her clothes and makeup. Kat shouts at Shenice to take the clothes off, and Shenice flinches thinking Kat is going to hit her. The next day, Shenice is caught trying to steal cigarettes from the local shop, which Kat chastises a drunken Martina for. Martina calls her daughter useless before going to bed, and Shenice tells Kat and Alfie that Martina says things she does not mean when she is drunk. The next day, Martina tells Kat that she is back with her boyfriend and she will get some money so she and Shenice can move out. Kat and Alfie organise a birthday party for Shenice as Martina has forgotten and Shenice takes a disliking to Tiffany Butcher (Maisie Smith) as they are wearing the same outfit. Shenice has to leave halfway through the party as Martina finds a place to live, and they move out, leaving Kat and Alfie distraught.

Kat and Alfie holiday in Spain and return with Shenice. Shenice and Tiffany become friends again but Shenice grows bored as Kat cannot take her and Tiffany out anywhere because of Kat's baby son Tommy. Shenice bonds with Kat's relative Jean Slater (Gillian Wright) after helping her plant some window boxes. When Shenice is due to go back to Spain, she begs to stay in Walford and Alfie agrees. Shenice is then enrolled at Walford Primary School. Martina allows Shenice to spend Christmas with Kat and Alfie. When Jean is questioned for benefit fraud, it sparks off another bipolar episode. This results in Jean believing that Shenice is an angel sent from her daughter Stacey Branning (Lacey Turner). Jean tries to take Shenice ice skating whilst dressed in pyjamas. Shenice manages to escape and runs back to The Queen Vic to alert Kat and Alfie. Jean's mental health improves, and though Shenice is wary of her for a time, she allows Jean to become her honorary grandma. Shenice goes to visit Martina in Spain, and on 7 September 2012 Kat reveals to Alfie that she is not coming back.

Development
Harvey is the real-life sister of Lacey Turner, who played Stacey Slater, and first appears on screen on 28 February 2011. Producers were unaware that Harvey and Turner were related until after the casting was made. Executive producer Bryan Kirkwood explained: "I sat down and watched a tape of a very talented young girl and it was only after we decided to cast [Harvey] that I was told [she] was [Turner]'s sister. [Harvey] got the role entirely on her own merits." In April 2011 it was announced that Harvey would be reprising the role. She made her return on 1 August 2011.

In July 2012, Harvey was nominated in the Best Young Actor category at the 2012 Inside Soap awards for her portrayal of Shenice.

Ashley Chubb

Ashley Chubb, played by Colin Mace, is the father of established character Fatboy (Ricky Norwood). He is mentioned in the episode broadcast on 14 March 2011 when Fatboy says his parents have split up because Ashley has lost his job. Ashley arrives in Walford two weeks later, needing a place to stay. Fatboy invites him to stay with his friend, Mercy Olubunmi (Bunmi Mojekwu), and her grandmother, Grace Olubunmi (Ellen Thomas), but has to sneak him in so Grace does not find out. Ashley then rents a room at the local bed and breakfast, run by Kim Fox (Tameka Empson). He asks Fatboy for money, saying he has a job interview out of town but spends it on alcohol, telling Kim that he has done a one-off job for a friend. Fatboy discovers that Ashley is simply drinking away the money he lent him, and Kim leaves, telling Ashley not to stress about the rent. Fatboy tells Ashley that he is in love with Mercy but she has a boyfriend, so to help Fatboy, he reports Mercy to the border agency for having an expired visa, which Fatboy told him about. Ashley then leaves Walford and two days later the UK Border Agency talk to Mercy and deport her. Before she leaves, Fatboy proposes.

It was announced on 23 January 2011 that EastEnders producers were planning to expand Fatboy's family due to his popularity, and were in the process of casting his father. The part was cast to Mace, who filmed five episodes. Ashley is said to be a wheeler-dealer like his son. Ashley's arrival is reported to be due to difficulties in his personal life. An EastEnders insider is reported to have said "Fatboy has been a real hit with viewers and the bosses have decided that it's now time to bring in his dad so people can see what Fatboy is really all about." Ashley has been described as "dishevelled". Although Ashley only makes a guest appearance, Norwood expressed a hope for the character to return so the relationship between father and son could be further explored, adding, "There's great chemistry between Ashley and Fatboy". Ashley appeared in episodes between 31 March and 21 April 2011. He returned on 31 May 2011.

Lydia Simmonds

Lydia Simmonds, initially played by Margaret Tyzack and then by Heather Chasen, is the maternal grandmother of Ricky (Sid Owen) and Janine Butcher (Charlie Brooks). She made her first appearance on 5 April 2011. She left the series on 13 June 2011. Described as twisted, manipulative, damaged and "[a] lady of class and dignity", Lydia's backstory states that she loved her daughter June but hated the man June married, Frank Butcher (Mike Reid), so she grew old alone and lived a life of solitude. Lydia and Janine were estranged for years and Janine is shocked to have her grandmother back in her life. The character and casting were announced on 15 February 2011, and of her casting, Tyzack said "I am delighted to be joining a great British tradition and a fine company of actors", and Executive Producer Bryan Kirkwood said: "What a coup to have Margaret Tyzack starring in EastEnders. She is an actress of incredible class and talent. Lydia has endless possibilities as a character, and I can't wait to see Janine meet her match."

Cora Cross

Cora Cross, played by Ann Mitchell, is the mother of Tanya Branning (Jo Joyner) and Rainie Cross (Tanya Franks). Cora initially appeared from 11 to 15 April 2011, and returned as a regular character on 28 July. Cora and her casting were announced on 21 March 2011, when she was described as having "a brash, outspoken attitude and does not care who she offends. She also quickly puts Tanya under scrutiny, believing that success has turned her into a snob". It was said that she secretly wants to heal the rift between Tanya and Rainie. She has also been described as a "bolshie battleaxe". Mitchell said of her casting "As a lifelong fan of EastEnders, I am thrilled to join the cast. I am a great fan of June Brown's [who plays Dot Branning] and am looking forward to sharing some scenes with her." Cora initially appeared from 11 to 15 April 2011. On 31 May 2011, it was confirmed that Cora would be returning to EastEnders as a regular character. Kirkwood said, "We all love Cora here—actress Ann Mitchell could be one of the Walford greats. She'll be returning late in the summer and is here to stay." Kirkwood added that he was keen to establish the Cross women.

Daniel Kilkelly from Digital Spy said, "During her brief stay on Albert Square, Cora quickly became known for her brash attitude and outspoken ways." Kate White of Inside Soap praised the character saying "All hail the new queen of soap – fabulous Cora is everything the discerning viewer could ever want." White added she could watch Mitchell acting "her socks off" all day long.

Martin

Martin, played by Alasdair Harvey, is a love interest for Jane Beale (Laurie Brett), who appears between 26 April and 3 May 2011. He first appears when he is seen sitting at the bar of The Queen Victoria public house and Jane asks him to join her pub quiz team. Afterwards, Martin asks Jane to invite him next time. Martin passes his number to Jane via her brother Christian Clarke (John Partridge), asking her to call him. On Jane's 40th birthday, he turns up at the pub and goes over to Jane. They both lie about their lives and jobs, but as they are about to kiss, Martin says he cannot keep lying as he likes Jane too much, and says he's divorced with a child and lives in a pokey flat. Jane also tells the truth and stops Martin leaving, saying her house is not pokey and they can go there. They kiss as they enter the house but are surprised by Jane's husband Ian Beale (Adam Woodyatt) and his son Bobby (Alex Francis), throwing her a surprise dinner. The next day, Jane tries to end their brief relationship, but he kisses her, which Ian sees through the window, though Jane dumps him.

The Daily Star reported that Jane will have a one-night stand with Martin and viewers would be left wondering if she would confess to her husband, Ian. However, an EastEnders source told Digital Spy, "It doesn't go as far as a one-night stand, but Jane is flattered by the attention, they exchange phone numbers, there's some flirting and a couple of kisses." Martin has been described as a "hunk".

Marta Demboski

Marta Demboski, played by Magdalena Kurek, is a Polish carer interviewed and subsequently hired by Dot Branning (June Brown), who appears from 6 to 24 May 2011. When she starts working, Dot is strict and wants everything done a certain way. Marta tells Dot's friend Edward Bishop (Frank Barrie) that nothing she does is right in Dot's eyes. Dot later finds out that Marta is working nights as well, and Marta explains that her husband drinks and lost his job. She begs Dot not to tell the agency, and Dot allows her to continue working for her. When Marta returns a week later, Dot says she does not need any help and makes Marta look after her husband, Jim Branning (John Bardon), but Marta protests that that is not her job. The following day, Marta arrives late, annoying Dot. While Dot is looking through her purse, she finds a £10 note which she drops on the floor. She leaves the room, but comes back having lost the cash and accuses Marta of stealing it, thinking she put it on the table; Marta is fired by Dot. Dot later finds the money on the floor and regrets sacking Marta.

After Marta was seen smoking an electronic cigarette, it was reported that some viewers who smoked had switched from real cigarettes. The electronic cigarettes were supplied by E-Lites, and Adrian Everett, one of the company's founders and directors, said: "[W]e were delighted to be asked to supply E-Lites to the makers of EastEnders as part of a new storyline. The fact that electronic cigarettes were featured in an everyday scene is a fantastic example of how our products are being accepted by the wider population. More people are becoming aware of E-Lites every day and this is yet another big step forward."

Jimmie Broome

Jimmie Broome, played by Samuel James, is Phil Mitchell's (Steve McFadden) lawyer. He appeared between 17 May 2011 and 13 December 2012, before returning on 12 May 2017.

He first appears after being hired by Phil to represent Jane Beale (Laurie Brett) in her divorce hearing with Ian Beale (Adam Woodyatt). In November, he is hired again to help Phil's cousin Roxy Mitchell (Rita Simons) regain custody of her daughter Amy Mitchell (Amelie Conway) from the father, Jack Branning (Scott Maslen). He suggests that Roxy dig up as much dirt on Jack and his family as she can. Roxy does this, deciding to use Jack's brother Derek Branning's (Jamie Foreman) criminal past against Jack, as Derek is staying with him, but this fails and a court grants custody to Jack. Phil then sacks Jimmie, though his relative Billy Mitchell (Perry Fenwick) asks Jimmie for advice on his pregnant granddaughter, Lola Pearce (Danielle Harold), whose baby could be taken into care once it is born. Jimmie advises Billy to apply for a Special Guardianship Order, which would grant him legal responsibility for the child. He returns on 9 February 2012 at Amy's custody case, after which Roxy gains custody of her. On 23 October 2012, apparently re-hired, Jimmie speaks to Phil about gaining custody of Lola's baby Lexi Pearce, as she has been taken into care and is actually Phil's granddaughter. Jimmie says that Phil would have a better chance of gaining custody if he is in a stable relationship. Jimmie later tells Phil that his son Ben's (Joshua Pascoe) murder charge has been dropped and he will be tried for manslaughter, and that Ben has agreed to a visit from Phil. When Jimmie advises Phil that he needs to find a way to prove to the court that he has a good support network for Lexi, Phil secretly orders Jimmie to put Sharon's name down on the application as his fiancée. Jimmie helps Phil to become Lexi's foster father, while Lola is allowed three access visits a week.

In 2017, Jack hires Jimmie when Charlie Cotton (Declan Bennett), father of Matthew Mitchell Cotton, who is the son of Jack's deceased wife, Ronnie Branning (Samantha Womack), wants residence of Matthew.

Eddie Moon

Eddie Moon, played by David Essex, is the father of Michael Moon (Steve John Shepherd), Tyler Moon (Tony Discipline) and Anthony Moon (Matt Lapinskas). On 24 January 2011, it was announced that Essex had been cast in the role of Eddie, Michael's father. It was stated that Eddie's other children would arrive after him, and his "fractured" relationship with Michael would be explored. Eddie's sons, Tyler and Anthony, were announced on 10 May 2011, and Kirkwood said that the Moon family were "on their way to becoming an established family in the Square." Kirkwood later said, "[Essex] is a legend in his own right. I can't wait for the audience reaction when he hits the screens in a few weeks. I'm hoping viewers come to love him."

Eddie is described as a "loveable rogue" who is cheeky, likeable and charismatic. The EastEnders website says he has a dark past that he is trying to escape, and calls him a polite gentleman who makes friends for life, and is popular with the ladies. Essex said that when Eddie was younger, he would have been a "mirror image" of Michael, but has since become more philosophical, and is less hot headed than Michael. Essex told Digital Spy that Eddie is "a strong character", who is an ex-boxer. Essex said Eddie's chequered past would unfold and opined that "He's not a bad guy". He also explained that Eddie is separated from his wife, and that Tyler and Anthony are Michael's half brothers. Eddie works as an antiques dealer and also has a daughter, Francesca, referred to as Frankie in the series.

Shameem

Shameem, played by Seeta Indrani, is the sister-in-law of Yusef Khan (Ace Bhatti) and aunt of Afia Khan (Meryl Fernandes). She appears on 21 and 23 June 2011.

She appears when she arrives for Afia's mehndi to Tamwar Masood (Himesh Patel). She arrives before the mehndi to help out, at Kim Fox's (Tameka Empson) bed and breakfast. Yusef introduces her to everyone, and Shameem takes an instant dislike to Kim and her sister, Denise Fox (Diane Parish). Shameem is a witty and confident woman who is willing to drink in moderation despite her religion however she is also shown to be haughty and arrogant with a vicious tongue. She insults Denise in her own home and accuses her of wanting seduce Yusef. She is also annoyed at Afia for not doing a proper Muslim mehndi ceremony, though later agrees to it. She attends the mehndi and whilst she is outside, she overhears Yusef and his ex-wife Zainab Masood (Nina Wadia) talking about their history. She suspects they are having an affair, and tells all the guests at the mehndi, leaving everyone shocked. When Zainab tries to prove that she is not having an affair, her husband, Masood Ahmed (Nitin Ganatra) punches Yusef.

When it was reported that Shameem would suspect that Yusef and Zainab are having an affair, a source said, "The whole day turns into a disaster. When Shameem sees Yusef and Zainab together she automatically thinks they're having an affair. Everyone struggles to come to terms with what they have just heard. Afia is devastated and demands answers from her dad Yusef. He assures her it is all lies before leaving to find Zainab. It's one hell of a fall-out."

Tyler Moon

Tyler Moon, played by Tony Discipline, is the son of Eddie Moon (David Essex), half brother of Michael Moon (Steve John Shepherd), brother of Anthony Moon (Matt Lapinskas) and cousin of Alfie Moon (Shane Richie). The character was announced on 10 May 2011, along with Anthony, and made his first appearance on 27 June 2011. Discipline heard about the part in November 2010 from his agent, so decided to audition and returned two weeks later for a workshop. At the workshop, there were six actors shortlisted to play Tyler and six shortlisted to play Anthony. The actors were paired off, and Discipline was paired with Lapinskas. A month later, Discipline attended a screen test, and after a further screen test, he found out he had got the part. The younger of the brothers, Tyler was described as having a short fuse and "quick to use his fist to sort things out", and the two new brothers are said to be "a couple of likely lads who are more than likely to cause a stir in Albert Square." Discipline described Tyler as "very sparky and very charismatic! He can be quick to snap at certain people sometimes if they get on the wrong side of him, but he's a lovely guy. He's also very flirty when it comes to the women! He's a bit of a chap to say the least! It's not because he's seedy or he's horrible or anything like that—he genuinely enjoys chatting to women and chasing them. Even if they turned him down, it's all part of the chase and that's fun for Tyler. You can expect a lot of flirting, a lot of girls and maybe some arguments. We shall see!" Daniel Kilkelly from Digital Spy added that the character has a lot of energy.

Norman Simmonds

Norman Simmonds, played by George Layton, is the estranged son of Lydia Simmonds (Heather Chasen). He is first mentioned in the episode broadcast on 9 June, when Lydia calls him a waste of space and says he will get nothing in her will. He arrives in Walford on 5 July, as an "unexpected guest" at his mother's funeral. Norman left EastEnders on 27 October 2011. Norman returned for a single episode on 2 January 2012.

Norman goes to Pat Evans' (Pam St Clement) house and they recognise each other, and he mentions that he is widowed again, having been married five times. Norman's niece, Janine Malloy (Charlie Brooks) is angry with him because he never bothered with his mother while she was alive. A week later, Pat calls him and asks him to contest the will against Janine who is the sole beneficiary. The next day, Norman phones up Pat, and asks her to visit him in hospital after he stepped on a rake. Pat tries to persuade Norman not to contest the will after all, and he later agrees. It is clear that Norman likes Pat, but she is oblivious to this. Jean Slater (Gillian Wright) takes a liking to Norman and asks him to dress as a Pearly King to help with her campaign to stop the community centre closing. Jean hopes that she can be his Pearly Queen, but he asks Pat to do it instead, and she reluctantly agrees.

Norman asks Pat out but she rejects him, while Jean's liking of Norman intensifies. Jean agrees to go to a skiffle event with him. However, she misunderstands, as he is actually giving her both tickets and not going with her. Jean's relative Kat Moon (Jessie Wallace) confronts Norman for playing games but he insists he was never planning to go with Jean. This causes an argument between Kat, Pat and Janine, and Janine tells Norman that Pat used to be a prostitute. Norman tells Janine he is ashamed to be related to her. Jean soon becomes obsessed with Norman, constantly sending him text messages. She invites him to dinner, but he says no, saying he would not want to make a habit of it. Jean then mistakenly thinks Norman wants to live with her. He is shocked at this, and asks Kat's husband Alfie (Shane Richie) for help. Alfie makes things worse though, so Norman is forced to tell Jean that they should just be friends, as he feels she is too good for him.

When Pat discovers that her son, Simon Wicks (Nick Berry), who lives in New Zealand, is going to lose his home, she fails to get a loan because of her age. Norman offers to help and organises a loan for her. After speaking to her great-grandson Liam Butcher (James Forde), Pat decides she likes Norman and they kiss, she also asks him to stay. However, the next day Norman tells Patrick Trueman (Rudolph Walker) that he regularly earns commission for organising loans for people. Patrick then warns Pat about this, and once Pat finds out that the terms of the loan mean if she misses a payment she could lose her house, she rejects Norman, tells him to leave and says she never wants to see him again.

In January 2012, Norman returns to Walford, saying he has raised enough money to help Pat with the loan. However, Pat has since died from pancreatic cancer, so he goes to the Butchers' house to pay his respects.

Digital Spy reported that "sparks fly" when Norman runs into Pat Evans and he develops a soft spot for her. The character and casting were announced on 12 June 2011. Norman is described as "hapless, clumsy and unlucky in life." Of his casting, Layton said "I am thrilled to be joining such a wonderful cast and crew—Norman is a great part and I'm excited to play him. I can't wait to get stuck into life in Albert Square—and hopefully the odd tipple or three in the Queen Vic!"

Lola Pearce

Lola Pearce, played by Danielle Harold, is the 15-year-old granddaughter of Billy Mitchell (Perry Fenwick) and Julie Perkins (Cathy Murphy). The character of Lola was announced on 7 June 2011 and she was created as an extension of the established Mitchell family.  As she meets her grandparents for the first time, Lola quickly forms a bond with them as she has been deserted by everyone else in her life. Eighteen-year-old Harold was cast in the role and she said "I am so excited to be joining EastEnders. I have watched the show all my life and I never thought that one day I could be in Albert Square. It feels strange to be walking round Walford with people I have grown up watching—I still have to pinch myself.". EastEnders is Harold's first acting job and she was given the role following her first audition, which shocked her. Harold told Daybreak, "It was my first audition that I'd ever had, so I was really nervous and I was thinking, 'I'm never going to get it – I'm just going to have fun while I'm there'. I was just shocked to even get the casting for it, so I was over the moon when I actually got the part." Harold previously starred in Jamie Oliver's Channel 4 reality show Jamie's Dream School and got into an acting school because of the show. Harold said she had always wanted to be an actress and was grateful to be given a great character in Lola. Lola made her first appearance on 12 July 2011.

Anthony Moon

Anthony Moon, played by Matt Lapinskas, is the son of Eddie Moon (David Essex), half brother of Michael Moon (Steve John Shepherd), brother of Tyler Moon (Tony Discipline), and cousin of Alfie Moon (Shane Richie). The character made his first appearance in the episode broadcast on 25 July 2011. Anthony, along with brother Tyler, were both announced as new characters in May 2011 being played by Lapinskas and Discipline respectively, though Tyler made his debut at an earlier date. Described as someone who "will rely on his brains and natural wit to find a more sensitive solution to any conflict", it is shown that Anthony has a gambling problem before his arrival, which is later a focus of a storyline. Lapinskas said of his relationship with half brother Michael that Anthony "idolises" him and that Michael "corrupted" Anthony. When Eddie leaves, Anthony takes charge of his antiques business.

Lee

Lee, played by Mitchell Hunt, is a friend of Rob Grayson (Jody Latham), who lures his ex, Whitney Dean (Shona McGarty), back into Rob's hands. He appears between 15 August and 29 August 2011.

Lee approaches Whitney in Walford's café, where she refuses to let him pay for her. Later, he apologises and says he will go for a drink with her if he buys something from her market stall. She calls him a pervert and tells him to leave. He later talks to her again and asks for her phone number. Whitney is eventually convinced to do so. Lee takes Whitney bowling, and afterwards they kiss. When Whitney texts Lee that she wants to meet again, it is revealed that Lee is a friend of Rob, who previously forced Whitney into prostitution, and Lee hands his phone to Rob. After Rob is killed in a fight with Whitney's brother Ryan Malloy (Neil McDermott), Lee visits Whitney and tells her not to get his name involved as police have visited him. She tells him to leave, deliberately causing a scene, and he leaves.

Speaking of his time on EastEnders, Hunt said in an interview, "It was great. It was my first job out of drama school, as I only finished a few weeks before. I had to jump straight into it, but everyone was so nice. The cast and crew really are just like one big family. Everything moves so fast. There are four cameras on you at any one time, so there is no room for error." Hunt also hoped for a return for Lee, saying, "Well, my character doesn't die, so there's always hope!"

Rose Cotton

Rose Cotton, played by Polly Perkins, is the estranged half-sister of Dot Branning (June Brown). On 18 May 2012, Daniel Kilkelly of Digital Spy confirmed Perkins was leaving EastEnders. Rose's last episode was on 19 July 2012.

She is first seen when Dot goes to visit her in Southend-on-Sea where she lives, as she has decided to make amends before she dies. Dot sees Rose in a bar, drinking and flirting with a group of men, and leaves without speaking to her. She later follows her to an address, and Rose lies that she is well off and her husband has died. Dot leaves but returns when she realises she has left something behind. She finds that the dead man is alive and Rose has lied about everything. Dot goes to her actual home and Rose admits she did not want Dot to think bad of her. Dot tells Rose she may not have long to live and did not want to die before making amends. They start to bond, and Dot meets Rose's son Andrew (Ricky Grover), and there is animosity between mother and son. Before Dot is due to leave, Rose asks to spend some more time with her. Dot says as they are both lonely, Rose should live with her in Walford, and Rose agrees. Andrew drives them there but reveals his last name is Cotton, and Rose is forced to admit that Andrew's father is Dot's first husband Charlie Cotton (Christopher Hancock), who had a bigamous marriage with Rose. Dot kicks Rose out but she later returns, saying she does not want to lose her sister again.

Rose moves in and Dot urges her to earn money. When Dot gossips to her about Jean Slater (Gillian Wright) and her family, Rose uses this information to make Jean think she is psychic, and Jean pays her for her services. She then gets a trial working for Dr. Yusef Khan (Ace Bhatti) as his receptionist. She gets the job and appears to enjoy it, although her constant pining over Yusef appears to irritate him somewhat. Rose reveals to Dot that she is behind with the paperwork at the surgery while Yusef has been away. Dot helps Rose sort through her workload, but they discover that Rose has misplaced some test results for a patient who has since died. Rose fears her oversight resulted in the patient's death, but Reverend Stevens (Michael Keating) tells her the patient died of a bee sting. A relieved Rose then flirts with Reverend Stevens, much to the chagrin of Dot. A few days later, Dot reveals Rose's shady past to Reverend Stevens. However, the Reverend is intrigued, and he and Rose share a drink at The Queen Victoria public house, as he wants to know more about her life. Rose brings alcohol to a church social event, which Dot is against, but Reverend Stevens thanks Dot for making it the best so far. Rose and Reverend Stevens grow closer at the event, resulting in him asking for Dot's blessing to date Rose. Rose later has sex with Patrick Trueman (Rudolph Walker) upsetting Reverend Stevens. Cora finds this funny but Dot kicks Cora out for laughing. Rose later apologises to Dot for embarrassing her and forgives Dot for the things she said, however, Dot asks Rose to move back to Southend. Dot also discovers Rose's passport which reveals Rose had remarried again and had the surname of Beauchamp. When Dot confronts her, Rose reveals that the marriage was abusive. Dot then allows Rose to move back in with her. Rose later does some card readings with Jean, Kim Fox (Tameka Empson) and Denise Fox (Diane Parish). In December 2011 Andrew comes back to Walford in December, and promises to stay for Christmas, much to the delight of Rose and Dot.

In January 2012, Abi Branning (Lorna Fitzgerald) finds a love note in the charity shop and finds out the book the note was in belongs to her maternal grandmother, Cora Cross (Ann Mitchell). However, Abi sees Rose reading the same note, leaving Abi confused. Cora then discovers the letter Rose is reading and asks why is anybody writing to her, leaving the two ladies to have an argument. When Rose receives more love letters, Dot and Cora rummage through her things to try and discover who the mystery man is. They are horrified when they learn he is serving a life sentence in prison, although Rose seems unfazed by this. Dot then attempts to put a stop to it by writing on Rose's behalf, but reveals her real name and address, not realising that Rose used a false name and a PO Box address.

Andrew announces that he is to marry Heather Trott (Cheryl Fergison). Rose is unhappy at Andrew's choice of bride, and tries to undermine Heather. Heather eventually stands up to Rose, saying she is bullying her, and Rose later realises that she is just jealous and does not want to lose her son. Rose then helps dot arrange the wedding. However, on Heather's hen party, Rose gets drunk and leaves early. At home, she tries on Heather's wedding dress. Andrew discovers her, gets angry and rips the dress. It is also revealed that Andrew has spent time in prison for assaulting Rose's abusive husband. Dot and Rose hastily repair Heather's wedding dress on the night before the wedding, but are distraught when they learn that Heather has been murdered. The police arrest Andrew, and Patrick finds the burnt remains of a hoodie worn by members of Andrew's stag-party. Desperate to prove Andrew's innocence, Rose, Dot and Cora break into the R&R nightclub where he worked and find Andrew's hoodie, which they hand to the police. Andrew is released from custody. In May 2012, Dot leaves to spend a few months with her granddaughter Dotty (Molly Conlin). Rose then becomes lonely, and is jealous of the friendship between Cora and Patrick. Andrew calls Dot, who invites Rose to stay with her, and Rose leaves Walford.

In 2022 and upon Dot’s death, Rose is mentioned by Sonia Fowler (Natalie Cassidy) as not being able to attend the funeral as she and Andrew are stuck on a cruise

Development
The casting of Perkins in the role was announced on 27 May 2011 and the character first appeared on screen on 22 August 2011. She is described as "flighty, fun and not one to age gracefully". Rose and Dot have been estranged for most of their lives, since Rose had an affair with Dot's first husband, Charlie Cotton. Dot decides to track Rose down after suffering a bout of hypochondria, feeling it is time to put things right, however, Rose is not pleased to see Dot again after so many years. Perkins said of her casting, "I am thrilled to be joining the cast of EastEnders, the show is a real British institution with an extraordinary creative team. I'm really looking forward to working with June again, who I have been friends with for over 30 years." Perkins and Brown were pictured filming scenes on a beach in Thorpe Bay in Essex. A spokesperson said "All I'll say is we are filming some big episodes, which we plan to broadcast later this summer. It's not our policy to comment on episodes like this so early."

Andrew Cotton

Andrew Cotton, played by Ricky Grover, is a love interest for Heather Trott (Cheryl Fergison) who first appears on 22 August 2011 until 26 August. He returned on 13 December. He departed on 24 August 2012.

Andrew is first seen when Heather and her friend Shirley Carter (Linda Henry) go to a 1980s festival in Southend-on-Sea, though Heather has not told Shirley it is for couples. Shirley walks out but when she returns, it is too late for them to go in but Andrew, who is working on the door, lets them in anyway. Heather tells Andrew that she and Shirley are lesbians as the event is for couples, but he thinks Heather is lying, and she admits it. When Andrew talks to Shirley, she says Heather is not interested and Heather thinks Andrew is more interested in Shirley. Eventually, Shirley tells Heather that Andrew likes her, but did not tell her in case it was purely for a bet. This upsets Heather, who tells Andrew the bet is off. Heather soon realises she was wrong and meets Andrew in the restaurant of the hotel where she is staying. Heather's friend Dot Branning (June Brown) arrives with her half sister Rose Cotton (Polly Perkins) and it is revealed that Andrew is Rose's son and they do not get on. Andrew and Rose trade insults at the table and he and Heather decide to leave. Heather tells Andrew he should not speak to his mother that way and decides to leave. Andrew finds out Rose has decided to live with Dot and will be left on his own. He drives them to Walford and finds Heather, and she says she will find him next time she is in Southend. He tells her his name as Andrew Cotton, revealing to Dot that his father is her first husband Charlie Cotton (Christopher Hancock), and that he had a third bigamous marriage. Andrew then returns to Southend.

Andrew returns to Walford in December and promises to stay for Christmas, much to Rose and Dot's delight. He meets Heather again, and vows to her that he will make up for his past mistakes with her. Heather initially rejects him, but then they share a kiss. He later asks to spend Christmas with her, and she agrees. Andrew starts working as a doorman at the R&R nightclub. Heather is upset when he chooses to work instead of spending the night with her. Andrew leaves Heather several messages, explaining he was scared and he will wait in the café until she arrives. However, he is asked to leave because he is taking up a seat and he refuses. In his anger, he pushes a table over, which Heather witnesses. She forgives him, and the couple soon admit their love for each other. They attend a dance class with Kim Fox (Tameka Empson) and Heather is impressed with Andrew's dance moves. He also picks up a poster about gastric band surgery, which Rose finds and confronts Heather about. He tells Heather he is fixing Dot's tap but Heather thinks he is having the surgery, but he reveals he was looking for an engagement ring. He proposes and Heather accepts and they have sex for the first time. Andrew soon notices that Heather spends more time with Shirley than with him, and gets angry with Heather. Heather and Andrew settle their differences and spend more time together.

At Heather's hen night, Andrew's temper emerges again when he almost hits Shirley and it is revealed that Andrew went to prison for assaulting Rose's husband. Heather stays with Andrew as he explains that Rose's husband regularly abused her. Sick of the interference in their wedding, Andrew suggests to Heather that they elope. Heather is unsure, so he gives her two train tickets and tells her to meet him at The Queen Victoria public house by 6 pm if she wants to elope with him. Heather does not arrive, so Andrew gets drunk, leaves the pub and considers leaving Walford. He is persuaded to stay by a homeless man, Gerry (Michael Elliott), and returns to Heather's flat, only to find that Heather has been murdered. Andrew is arrested by the police, as he doesn't have an alibi for where he was when Heather died and they suspect him as he cannot prove that a tramp stole Heather's money from him. However, he is eventually released without charge. Shirley confronts Andrew and publicly accuses him of murdering Heather. However, when it is suggested that Andrew should leave Walford, he declares that he plans to stay. Dot doubts Andrew's innocence but when Andrew opens up to Dot about his feelings for Heather, Dot changes her mind. This leads to Shirley banning Andrew and Dot from Heather's funeral. However, Shirley later finds the train tickets that Andrew gave Heather the night she died and realises he is innocent. She later admits that she wanted him to be the killer as she was jealous and the pair agree to unite to find Heather's real killer. Dot and Rose eventually leave Walford, leaving Andrew with no family there. Heather's killer is eventually revealed to be Ben Mitchell (Joshua Pascoe) after he confesses to the police. When Jay Mitchell (Jamie Borthwick) is released on bail charged with perverting the course of justice for protecting Ben, Andrew accuses Shirley of protecting them as they were living with her. When he sees Jay, he attacks him in The Queen Vic by pushing him onto a table. The next day, Andrew realises that he will never be able to move on as long as he stays in Walford because of the memories and decides to leave. In 2022, he cannot attend Dot’s funeral as he is on a cruise with Rose.

Creation and development
In November 2011, executive producer Bryan Kirkwood told Inside Soap that Andrew would be returning to EastEnders to woo Heather. In March 2012, Grover said that Andrew will be staying with EastEnders, despite Heather's departure. Speaking to Inside Soap, Grover said: "EastEnders have asked me to stay on as a more regular character, so I'm hoping to be involved for another year or so." He added that it was a lovely compliment as Andrew was originally intended for four episodes only and that it was a shock to hear that Fergison would be leaving the show. Grover revealed in April 2012 that he initially turned down the role of Andrew up to five times, before being persuaded to accept the role. Grover said he was scared of being branded a "silly fat couple" as both Andrew and Heather are overweight. He said he spoke to Steve McFadden (who plays Phil Mitchell), who is a friend of his and he told Grover that he can play the role how he wants so eventually accepted it. Speaking about his introduction, Grover added that Heather and Andrew were "hitting it off" and it is like he and Fergison have been working together for years. Grover also added that when he is filming, he "makes it sound authentic".

Fergison commented on Heather feelings when Andrew proposes to her, saying that Heather "couldn't be happier". Fergison told All About Soap: "He tells Heather he has to go and fix Dot's leaky tap, but she discovers he's lying. Her mind goes into overdrive and she's convinced he must be involved in dodgy dealings. She's been let down so many times before, and her initial reaction is to fly off the handle. In the end, he proposes with a plastic washer from Dot's tap," she continued. "Heather's thrilled, though, and couldn't be happier – the ring could have been from a lucky-dip bag and she'd have still said yes. She can't believe her luck." Fergison also added that Heather and Andrew are likely to have a budget wedding if it goes ahead. She continued: "It will all be done on a shoestring, but they'll want it to look like the whole William-and-Kate affair," she said. "As for her dress, I'm sure with Mrs Branning and Mrs Cotton interfering, it could be anything from a lacy number to a meringue. Whatever they pick, it won't be very Heather-ish and it'll be completely out of her hands. She won't mind — as long as the family pull together to make it a special day, she'll be happy."

Fergison said that there will be tension between Andrew and Heather's best friend Shirley Carter, played by Linda Henry. In an interview with Inside Soap, Fergison commented: "Heather has put her trust in Andrew in a very short period of time. Recently she walked into the café to see Andrew turn over a table in anger, so she knows he has a temper. But Heather really wants things to work out. She's aware there are alarm bells ringing, and whereas in the past she would have totally ignored them, she's more wary these days. But when better things override that and he's her lovely Andrew again, it's all fine." Speaking about Shirley's take on the situation, she continued: "There has always been friction between Shirley and whichever man Heather gets involved with. I think she was even jealous of baby George when he was born. That means there'll be serious sparks as the friction between Andrew and Shirley grows. We're talking fire and brimstone! And that's going to bring out this other side of Andrew once more."

Faith Olubunmi

Faith Olubunmi, played by Modupe Adeyeye, is the younger sister of Mercy Olubunmi (Bunmi Mojekwu). Faith is one of three main characters in the third series of EastEnders spin-off EastEnders: E20, and the only one to appear in EastEnders as well. She appears in EastEnders from 13 September 2011, before appearing in the spin-off. Faith was sent to Nigeria by her grandmother Grace Olubunmi (Ellen Thomas) "to get back on the straight and narrow, but she is back and worse than ever!" She arrives in Walford to tell Mercy's husband Fatboy (Ricky Norwood) that she has had the marriage annulled and asks for his wedding ring so she can sell it. She stays with Grace and attends a party where she kisses several men. Faith later holds a party at Grace's house and she has sex with Fatboy but they are caught by Grace. The next day, when Faith returns home drunk, Grace slaps her and kicks her out of the house. In EastEnders: E20, she is unable to find anywhere to live so starts squatting with Donnie Lester (Samuell Benta) and Ava Bourne (Sophie Colquhoun). They attempt to feed themselves by stealing from local business. When there is no hot water, Faith has sex with Fatboy to get a hot shower. Faith is placed in emergency care by Grace, and the three discover that their squat is to become their hostel. While there, Faith and Donnie have sex, and Faith discovers that Donnie is illiterate but offers to help him learn to read. She is then rejected by both Donnie and Fatboy. She discovers that Ava was involved in an arson attack when she was younger and is using a new identity, and calls a newspaper to tell them this. Ava then tells Faith that she was raped by their keyworker, Richard. Donnie overhears this and Richard is arrested. Journalists arrive but Faith tells them she lied. She ends up soaking their new keyworker, Theresa. Faith distracts the press by wearing a bikini and confronting them on her doorstep, whilst Donnie and Ava seek out another entrance.

Faith is described as someone who can be "an incredible amount of fun and excitement, and she has a cheekiness that charms most people. But she's not nearly as bright as she thinks she is—she can sometimes be reckless and downright dangerous. When Faith runs into [E20 characters] Donnie and Ava, she sees it as her chance to cause even more mischief!" Faith also has a profile on Twitter. In September, Adeyeye told Digital Spy that she had finished filming for EastEnders.

Craig Moon

Craig Moon, played by Elliot Rosen, is the long-lost brother of Michael Moon (Steve John Shepherd), and son of Eddie Moon (David Essex).

The character and casting was announced on 24 July 2011 and Craig first appeared on 16 September 2011. EastEnders worked closely with the Down's Syndrome Association whilst devising the storyline and were praised for "Presenting people with Down's Syndrome living successful lives." A spokesperson for the show added they were committed to raising issues such as Down's syndrome.

Yasmin Masood

Yasmin Masood
is the daughter of Syed Masood (Marc Elliott) and Amira Masood (Preeya Kalidas). Yasmin is mentioned in two extra scenes available on BBC Online and BBC Red Button, called Amira's Secret, on 6 and 8 September 2011, when Amira reveals that no man will want her any more, as she has Yasmin. Yasmin appears in the second scene. Yasmin made her first appearance in EastEnders on 10 October 2011 and left the show on 12 November 2012. Yasmin made another one off appearance on 19 May 2014.

Amira leaves Walford after finding out Syed is having an affair with Christian Clarke (John Partridge), though she is carrying a baby, which he does not know about. When Amira returns to Walford over a year later, she meets Yusef Khan (Ace Bhatti), who believes she has come to discuss getting divorced. However, Amira reveals that she wants Syed to meet his daughter. Yusef tries to persuade her she is doing the wrong thing and that Syed will want custody of Yasmin. However, Amira goes to Syed and Christian's engagement party and tells Syed he has a daughter but she does not want Christian to have anything to do with Yasmin but Syed refuses to visit without Christian. However, he later meets Amira and Yasmin in the park. Amira tries to manipulate Syed into spending more time with her and Yasmin. Amira lies, saying that Yasmin has swallowed her ring, leading to Yasmin going for an unnecessary trip to the hospital. Yusef, trying to tear the Masood family apart, tells Christian that Syed may not be Yasmin's father so he and Christian get a paternity test done, taking a hair from each of them. However, Yusef, who is the local GP, swaps Syed's hair sample for one of his own. The test results then show that Syed is not Yasmin's father, causing consternation for those involved, though Yusef's falsification is subsequently exposed. When Amira leaves Walford, she leaves Yasmin with Syed and Christian.

When Christian enters Yasmin into a "beautiful baby" competition, Syed becomes angry and refers to Yasmin as his daughter, not his and Christian's, leading to an argument between them. Amira returns a few months later as she wants Yasmin to live with her and her new fiancé in Birmingham. Syed eventually agrees but when Christian finds out, he tries to stop her. Syed tells him that it is for the best and after agreeing to stay in touch, Amira and Yasmin leave after a tearful goodbye. However, Syed and Christian soon leave Walford to move nearer to Yasmin. In May 2014, Yasmin appears when Ian Beale (Adam Woodyatt) visits Christian at his home in Birmingham, following the death of his daughter Lucy (Hetti Bywater). Christian is looking after Yasmin whilst Syed is at work and Ian is affected by seeing Yasmin, telling Christian the sort of things to expect with having a daughter, and when she grew up.

Development
In August 2011, it was revealed that Amira had "[gone] ahead with the pregnancy and will come back with a little girl", and Kalidas promised a lot of drama. Kalidas said Amira still loves Syed after what he did, and that Amira wants to get back with Syed as she "doesn't want her daughter to grow up without knowing her father". She said that Amira cannot move on from Syed, as Yasmin is a constant reminder of him. Nina Wadia, who plays Syed's mother Zainab, said of the storyline, "I can't wait for Syed's baby to come. I think it will help Zainab and Syed get closer as she'll want her grandchild and it may make her feel like her son is a proper man." Elliott said in May 2010 that Amira being pregnant was "a real shocker".

Mark Garland

Mark Garland, played by Chris Simmons, is a love interest for Kat Moon (Jessie Wallace). He first appears on 14 October 2011, when he is delivering alcohol to The Queen Victoria public house, of which Kat is a landlady. Mark tries to flirt with Kat but she tells him she is married. Mark later appears in the local nightclub, R&R, where he tries to chat up Kat, this time succeeding and they have a one-night stand. The next day, he returns at The Queen Vic and reminds her about the previous night and Kat refuses to serve him and makes Mark leave. The next day, Mark continues to phone Kat, but she rejects his calls.

It was reported that Kat faces temptation from Mark when she goes through marriage problems with her husband, Alfie Moon (Shane Richie), after he accuses her of having an affair. A source from EastEnders said, "A delivery driver who calls at The Queen Vic makes a big play for Kat—and soon she's facing serious temptation". Despite Kat and Mark flirting, it is unknown whether she will succumb to his charms. The Metro described him as "hunky" and "good looking". Inside Soap called him "creepy".

Others

References

External links

2011
, EastEnders
2011 in British television